Salt and light are images used by Jesus in the Sermon on the Mount, one of the main teachings of Jesus on morality and discipleship. These images are in Matthew 5:13, 14, 15 and 16 

The general theme of Matthew 5:13–16 is promises and expectations, and these expectations follow the promises of the first part.

The first verse of this passage introduces the phrase "salt of the earth":

The second verse introduces "City upon a Hill":

See also
 Five Discourses of Matthew
 Matthew 5:13
 Salt in the Bible
 Salt of the earth

References

Gospel of Luke
Gospel of Matthew
Light and religion
Metaphors
New Testament words and phrases
Sayings of Jesus
Sermon on the Mount
Matthew 5
Edible salt